Johan Brunström and Frederik Nielsen were the defending champions but Nielsen decided not to participate.
Brunström played alongside Raven Klaasen and successfully defended the title by defeating Jordan Kerr and Andreas Siljeström 6–3, 0–6, [12–10] in the final.

Seeds

Draw

Draw

References
 Main Draw

Intersport Heilbronn Open - Doubles
2013 Doubles